Samuel Thomas Fanning (born 20 October 2000) is an Australian cricketer who plays first-class cricket for the Western Australia cricket team. He made his first-class debut against New South Wales in the 2022–23 Sheffield Shield. He has also represented the Australian under-19 team in both Test and ODI cricket.

Career
Fanning represented Australia at the 2020 Under-19 Cricket World Cup. In the quarter-final against India he top-scored for Australia with 75 runs, but received two demerit points from the ICC for elbowing Akash Singh during the match. He also faced criticism along with some of his teammates for inappropriate comments made on social media during the tournament that appeared to mock non-native English speakers, with a Cricket Australia statement labelling the comments as "having no place in society".

Fanning plays for Perth in Western Australian Premier Cricket and had a breakout season in 2021–22, scoring more First Grade runs than any other batter, and scoring over 1000 runs for the season across all competitions by mid-January. His performance in grade cricket earned a call-up to his state side for the first match of the 2022–23 Sheffield Shield in which he scored a gritty 32 from 161 balls.

Shortly after his first-class debut Fanning played two T20 matches for Western Australia against a touring Indian side as part of the Indian warm-ups for the 2022 T20 World Cup. In the first of these matches Fanning gained attention for scoring a half-century after coming in with his team 4 wickets down for just 12 runs.

References

External links
 

2000 births
Living people
Australian cricketers
Western Australia cricketers